George Imlach McIntosh VC (24 April 1897 – 20 June 1968) was a Scottish recipient of the Victoria Cross, the highest and most prestigious award for gallantry in the face of the enemy that can be awarded to British and Commonwealth forces.

Details
He was 20 years old, and a private in the 1/6th Battalion, The Gordon Highlanders, British Army during the First World War when the following deed took place at the Battle of Passchendaele for which he was awarded the VC.

On 31 July 1917 at Ypres, Belgium, during the consolidation of a position, the company came under machine-gun fire at close range and Private Mclntosh immediately rushed forward under heavy fire and reaching the emplacement, threw a Mills grenade into it, killing two of the enemy and wounding a third. Subsequently, entering the dug-out he found two light machine-guns which he carried back with him. His quick grasp of the situation and the rapidity with which he acted undoubtedly saved many of his comrades and enabled the consolidation to proceed unhindered by machine-gun fire.

George McIntosh was born in Buckie, Banffshire. McIntosh went on to join the Royal Air Force and served in World War II, and during 1942 was the senior NCO with No 1 squadron. He later achieved the rank of Flight Sergeant.

His Victoria Cross is displayed at the Gordon Highlanders Museum, Aberdeen, Scotland.

Freemasonry
Edwards was a Scottish Freemason being Initiated in Lodge Gordon, No.589, (Buckie, Banffshire, Scotland) on 7 April 1920, Passed on 10 March and Raised on 6 April 1921.

References

Monuments to Courage (David Harvey, 1999)
The Register of the Victoria Cross (This England, 1997)
Scotland's Forgotten Valour (Graham Ross, 1995)
VCs of the First World War - Passchendaele 1917 (Stephen Snelling, 1998)

External links
Location of grave and VC medal (Grampian)

1897 births
1968 deaths
British World War I recipients of the Victoria Cross
British Army personnel of World War I
Gordon Highlanders soldiers
People from Buckie
British Army recipients of the Victoria Cross
Royal Air Force personnel of World War II
Royal Air Force airmen
Scottish military personnel